Centrenergo is a major electric and thermal energy producing company in central Ukraine and eastern Ukraine. 

The main activities of Centerenergo are the production of electricity supplied to the wholesale electricity market of Ukraine and the production of thermal energy.

The company's share in the total electricity production of Ukraine is about 8%, in the structure of thermal generation - about 18%. It plays a significant role in maintaining and regulating the country's energy balance.

Structure
The Company consists of three thermal power plants: Trypillya Power Station in Kyiv region, Zmiivska Power Station in Kharkiv region and Vuhlehirska Power Station in Donetsk region. It also owns a separate division of Remenergo, located in Cherkasy. The total installed capacity of production assets is 7690 MW, which is about 14% of the total capacity of power plants in Ukraine. To produce its products the company uses pulverized coal, natural gas and oil.

See also

 Ministry of Fuel and Energy (Ukraine)

References 

Electric power companies of Ukraine
Companies based in Kyiv